Bankass Cercle  is an administrative subdivision of the Mopti Region of Mali. The administrative center (chef-lieu) is at the town of Bankass.

The Cercle is divided into 12 rural communes:

Bankass
Baye
Diallassagou
Dimbal Habé
Kani Bonzon
Koulogon Habé
Léssagou Habé
Ouonkoro
Ségué
Sokoura
Soubala
Tori

References

Cercles of Mali
Ségou Region